Martin Šindelář (born 22 January 1991) is a Czech footballer who plays for FC Košice as a defender.

Club career

MFK Tatran Liptovský Mikuláš
Šindelář made his Fortuna Liga debut for Zlaté Moravce against Liptovský Mikuláš on 12 February 2022.

Honours 
SK Sigma Olomouc
 Czech Supercup: 2012

References

External links
 MFK Tatran Liptovský Mikuláš official club profile
 
 
 Futbalnet profile 

1991 births
Living people
Czech Republic youth international footballers
Czech footballers
Czech expatriate footballers
Expatriate footballers in Slovakia
Association football defenders
SK Sigma Olomouc players
FK Baník Sokolov players
FC Baník Ostrava players
MFK Karviná players
MFK Tatran Liptovský Mikuláš players
FC Košice (2018) players
Czech First League players
Slovak Super Liga players